Bear Naked is a food company that makes whole grain granolas, granola bites, and oatmeal. The company was launched in 2002 by Kelly Flatley and Brendan Synnott. In 2007, Bear Naked was purchased by Kashi, a subsidiary of the Kellogg Company, one of the biggest food corporations in the United States. Bear Naked is based out of La Jolla, California.

History 
Kelly Flatley and Brendan Synnott are the co-founders of Bear Naked granola. Flatley came up with the name – “bear” which evoked the outdoors, while “naked” implied the absence of additives. In college, Flatley made granola in her dorm room and shared it with friends. Flatley met Synnott in 2002 in Darien, Connecticut. Flatley was making her granola through the night and delivering it to local stores the next morning. They became business partners and began using a commercial kitchen. They were the only employees of the company at the time, so they created, distributed, and brokered the granola themselves. Initially, commercial distributors would not sell them raw materials, so they bought bulk from their local Costco. Synnott and Flatley pitched their products to organic and natural markets and increased the company's presence in stores. In 2003, Stew Leonard’s supermarket chain in New York picked up their granola, which helped pull the company into commercial success.

Acquisition by Kellogg 
In 2007, Flatley and Synnott were approached by Kashi, a subsidiary of the Kellogg Company. The partners sold Bear Naked for over $60 million. Flatley and Synnott stayed for a year to make a smooth transition to the new parent company. Today, Kellogg’s Kashi Co. organic unit manages the Bear Naked brand, from La Jolla, California.

Marketing

Design 
For its initial design, Bear Naked used a logo with three slashes suggesting bear claw marks. They chose a bear symbol because of its appetite for nuts, fruit, and honey. After a redesign in 2015, “Kevin” the bear was introduced. He now appears on all packaging, social media, and the company website. The new design uses orange, the signature color of Bear Naked's flagship Fruit and Nut granola. The color is meant to be energetic and targets millennials with active lives.

Packaging 
Bear Naked’s marketing strategy included presenting its product in a resealable cellophane pouch with a transparent window. In 2019, Bear Naked made its stand-up pouch from 100% recyclable materials. Customers can drop off the used bags at certain retail locations.

Products

Granola

Classic Granola 

 Banana Nut
 Cacao and Cashew
 Fruit & Nut
 Maple Pecan
 Peanut Butter

Bear Naked Granola Fit (Reduced Sugar) 

 Vanilla Almond
 Triple Berry
 Peanut Butter Crunch

Gluten-Free and Grain Free 

 Maple Cinnamon
 Chocolate Almond

Protein Granola 

 Original Cinnamon
 Honey Almond

Granola bites 

 Dark Chocolate Sea Salt (Chewy)
 Peanut Butter and Honey (Chewy)
 Honey Oat (Crunchy)
 Chocolate Chip (Crunchy)

Oatmeal 

 Maple Pecan Steel Cut Oatmeal and Crunchy Granola Topper
 Fruit and Nut Steel Cut Oatmeal and Crunchy Granola Topper

References

External links 
 Company Website

Food manufacturers of the United States
Kellogg's brands
Kellogg's cereals
Cereal bars
Food and drink companies established in 2002
2002 establishments in Connecticut
Companies based in Norwalk, Connecticut
Companies based in San Diego
2007 mergers and acquisitions